De nietsnut  is a 1992 Dutch film made for television, directed by Ab van Ieperen.

Cast
Pierre Bokma	... 	Frans
Jacques Bonnaffé		
Marjon Brandsma		
Hugo Maerten	... 	Lifter
Willem Nijholt		
Ramses Shaffy		
Rik van Uffelen		
Manouk van der Meulen

External links 
 

Dutch drama films
1992 films
1990s Dutch-language films

nl:De nietsnut